The Classic Aircraft Aviation Museum is an aviation museum located in Hillsboro in the U.S. state of Oregon. Started in 1998, the museum is located at the Hillsboro Airport in the Portland metropolitan area. Aircraft at the museum are either maintained in flyable condition or are restored so that they can be flown once again. As of March 2010, there were 15 aircraft in the museum's collection and Doug Donkel served as museum director.

History 

Roger Kelsay founded Premier Jets in 1984 as a charter flight company at the Hillsboro Airport. Over time, he acquired classic military aircraft, including a MiG-17F in 1995. The plane was built in 1958 and had been in the Polish Air Force. Kelsay then founded the Classic Aircraft Aviation Museum in 1998 and donated many of the planes in the museum's collection.

The museum had a performance at the 2006 Oregon International Air Show that featured the former Polish Air Force MIG-17F and a former Royal Air Force (UK) BAC Jet Provost Mk.3A, with the museum participating in the 2007 show  with the same aircraft. In January 2007, Classic Aircraft Aviation Museum purchased a MiG 21 from a Chevrolet dealership in Federal Way, Washington. The fighter had been displayed on the car dealer's sales lot, but the museum planned to restore the plane to flight worthy status.

Then in October of that year they received a F-104G from Taiwan's Feng Chia University. A Douglas C-47A was added to the museum's collection in 2009 when it was donated by a Southern Oregon man. That plane was built in 1942 and is the military version of the more famous DC-3. The museum's C-47A had previously been in the Royal Canadian Air Force and was later used as a freight hauler before a Roseburg, Oregon, collector acquired the still flyable aircraft.

Classic Aircraft Aviation Museum was again at the Hillsboro air show in 2010, this time with their Douglas A-26C Invader, MiG-17F, and F-86 Sabre performing in the show. In 2016, the museum lost its lease for one hangar, requiring the relocation of some of its collection. Some of the planes were sent to the Tillamook Air Museum.

Collection and mission

The hangar the museum is located in was once home to Premier Jets, which was owned by Roger Kelsay. Kelsay also owns most of the aircraft in the museum. The goal for all of the planes is that they once again are air worthy, and to that end, volunteers spend thousands of hours restoring the aircraft. The museum's specialty is restoring aircraft, though their collection also includes some aviation artifacts as well. This is part of their goal of educating the public through demonstrations of working aircraft. Other museum pieces include engines, ground equipment, and ejection seats.

Besides restoring the aircraft, volunteers are also responsible for conducting the tours of the hangar and putting on exhibitions. The free museum is only open Monday through Thursday.

Aircraft in the collection
 Two F-104s
 One Northrop F-5
 Two Douglas A-26C Tankers,
 One Douglas C-47A
 One BAC Jet Provost
 One MiG 17F
 Two MiG 21s
 One CL-13 Mk.6 Sabre
 One Fouga CM-170 Magister
 One Hawker Hunter F Mk.51

Aircraft in the museum come from as far away as Poland, Turkey, and Taiwan. Not all of the aircraft are located at the hangar in Hillsboro.

See also
List of aerospace museums

References

External links

Take off in Hillsboro - Hillsboro Tribune

Aerospace museums in Oregon
Museums established in 1998
Museums in Washington County, Oregon
Culture of Hillsboro, Oregon
1998 establishments in Oregon